DH3600 were diesel-hydraulic locomotive built for shunting operations on the Turkish State Railways. 38 units were built by Tüvasaş under licence from Maschinenbau Kiel (MaK). In 1980-81 the shunters were rebuilt with Cummins Diesel KT1150L engines.

External links
 Trains of Turkey page on DH3600

MaK locomotives
Turkish State Railways diesel locomotives
C locomotives
Standard gauge locomotives of Turkey
Railway locomotives introduced in 1968